Jonas Lalehzadeh is an American Iranian professional basketball player playing in the Iran Super League and NBA Developmental League. He led the Iranian Superleague in scoring and total points scored for the 2012-2013 season.

References

Iranian men's basketball players
Living people
Shooting guards
Year of birth missing (living people)